Annamalai is an Indian Tamil-language historical soap opera that aired on MediaCorp Vasantham. The series' first season was aired from 22 December 2014 to 31 March 2015 every Monday to Thursday at 10:00PM SST for 48 episodes.

The show starred James Kumar, Karthik Samasundram, Bharathi, Varman, Sri and Jemes Dorairaj among others. It was director by I. Sunder, S.s. Vikneshwaran, A. Mohamed Ali and Nagaraj Veerappan.

Cast

 James Kumar as Rajan Nambi
 Karthik Samasundram as Chinnayah
 Bharathi as Sanya
 Varman as Kirshna
 Bala Ganapathi William as Venu
 Sri as Annamalai
 Jemes Dorairaj as Samy
 Thanga Mani as Mondoor
 M. Nagarajoo as Ammaiyappan
 Sathis Rao as Thambi
 Windz as Yin Seng
 Devarajan as Pandiyan
 Chettiyar N. Ragavan as Manickam
 R. Somasundram as Arumugam
 MS Maniam as Murugappan Chettiyar
 Udhaya Sundari as Sakunthala
 Sasirekha as Sampooram
 T. Nakulan as Pachai
 Lingam as Govindasamy
 Param as Veerasamy
 Shalini as Sundri
 Kogila as Ponni
 Shafina as Rukku
 Sonia Shamini as Pappa
 Loganathan as Dharmalingam
 Maalika Girish Panicker as Bharathanatya Master
 Muthuletcumi as wife of Dharmalingam
 Jeyaram as Sigamani
 Deshna as Aandal
 Mark as Roberson
 Perrin William as Simon Ross
 Sani Maia as wife of Simon Ross
 Jegan as Chokkalingam
 Muthu as Mandoor
 Sanggari as Letchumi
 Kristina Vinockri as Setha
 Jessie as Malathi
 Santhini as Young Saguthala
 Loorna Hong as Sweelin
 Tan as Law Kim Fat
 Antony as Sathisivam
 Poorani as Pavithra
 Rajeshwary as Maid
 Ks Maniam as Ratnam
 Maniam as Ponnusamy
 Bala as Mappilai

Original soundtrack

Soundtrack

Seasons overview

Season 2
The second season, titled Annamalai Day of Reckoning was aired 29 June 2015 to 1 October 2015 every Monday to Thursday at 10:30PM SST for 52 episodes.

Season 3

The third season was aired 28 December 2015 to 31 March 2016 every Monday to Thursday at 10:30PM SST for 52 episodes.

References

External links 
 Vasantham Official Website
 Vasantham Facebook
 Annamalai Serial Episode

Vasantham TV original programming
Tamil-language television shows in Singapore
Singapore Tamil dramas
Tamil-language historical television series
Tamil-language romance television series
2014 Tamil-language television series debuts
2010s Tamil-language television series
2016 Tamil-language television series endings
2014 Tamil-language television seasons
2015 Tamil-language television seasons